Divide is an unincorporated community within the Rural Municipality of Frontier No. 19, Saskatchewan, Canada. The community is located 35 km directly south of the community of Robsart and 85 km southwest of the town of Eastend on Highway 18. Very little remains in Divide. Only a church and post office still stand.

Notable residents

Divide is the birthplace of hockey player Les Colwill.

See also 

 List of communities in Saskatchewan
 List of ghost towns in Canada
 Ghost towns in Saskatchewan

References 

Frontier No. 19, Saskatchewan
Unincorporated communities in Saskatchewan
Ghost towns in Saskatchewan
Division No. 4, Saskatchewan